The Roman Catholic Diocese of Valleyfield is a Catholic diocese in Quebec and a suffragan of the Archdiocese of Montreal. It was erected in 1892.

The diocese, which is based in the western suburbs of Montreal, features approximately 201,000 baptized Catholics. Parishioners are served by 48 priests, 17 deacons, 31 religious brothers, and 76 religious sisters. In 2008, the diocese consolidated its 63 parishes into 24.

Bishops

Ordinaries

Joseph-Médard Émard (1892–1922), appointed Archbishop of Ottawa
Felix-Raymond-Marie Rouleau, O.P. (1923–1926), appointed Archbishop of Québec (elevated to Cardinal in 1927)
Joseph Alfred Langlois (1926–1966)
Percival Caza (1966–1969)
Guy Bélanger (1969–1975)
Robert Lebel (1976–2000)
Luc Cyr (2001–2011),  appointed Archbishop of Sherbrooke, Québec
Noël Simard (since 2011)

Coadjutor bishop
Percival Caza (1955–1966)

Auxiliary bishop
Percival Caza (1948–1955), appointed Coadjutor here

Other priests of this diocese who became bishop
 Bernard Hubert, appointed Bishop of Saint-Jérôme, Québec in 1971
Paul-Émile Léger, appointed Archbishop of Montreal, Québec in 1950

Other priest of this diocese who became cardinal 

 Paul-Émile Léger, appointed Cardinal in 1953

References

Valleyfield
Salaberry-de-Valleyfield